Michael Lutrell "Pinball" Clemons  (born January 15, 1965) is an American-Canadian sports executive and former running back and return specialist who serves as general manager for the Toronto Argonauts of the Canadian Football League (CFL). He is considered by many to be one of the greatest and most famous Argos players of all time, as well as one of the most popular professional athletes in the history of Toronto.

A native of Dunedin, Florida, Clemons played college football at the College of William & Mary and was drafted in the eighth round of the 1987 NFL Draft by the Kansas City Chiefs. After two years in the NFL, Clemons joined the Argonauts in 1989, playing with them for twelve seasons where he was a two-time All-Star and a three-time Grey Cup Champion. After retiring from playing, he twice served as their head coach before becoming an administrator, since winning three more Grey Cups. His no. 31 jersey is one of only four that have been retired by the Argonauts.

Early life
Clemons was born and raised in Dunedin, Florida to an 18-year-old single mother, Anna Marie Bryant, who had just graduated from a segregated high school. His father, Willie Clemons, lived an hour and a half away from them while finishing up his university education and later became a school teacher.

Clemons started playing football at age 8 with the Dunedin Golden Eagles, a youth organization co-ordinated by the Police Athletic League.

Clemons and his mother lived in public housing across the street from the city's sewer plant until he was 14 years old. At this point in Clemons' life, his mother married his stepfather and would also become the first African-American to get an administrative job for the City of Dunedin.

Clemons's mother was also a heavy influence in him becoming a devout Christian as she was also a clerk at a Baptist church in Dunedin. Clemons and his family currently attend the Meeting House in Oakville, Ontario.

Clemons later formed a relationship with his father, Willie, during his college years. Even then, the relationship between him and his father was more like a nephew to an uncle, being limited to visits during his family vacations down in Florida and regular phone calls. Willie was also invited to the 2003 CFL Eastern Division semi-final game his son was coaching in Toronto vs. the B.C. Lions, marking the first time his father had actually seen him in any capacity with the Argonauts. Shortly afterwards, his father died.

College career
Clemons graduated with a degree in economics from the College of William & Mary where he played running back and return specialist on the football team, as well as playing varsity soccer for a year. In his four-year college football career, he compiled 4,778 all-purpose yards and was named a Division I-AA all-American.

Professional football career
In 1987, Clemons was drafted by the Kansas City Chiefs of the National Football League. During the 1987 NFL season, Clemons played in eight games, predominantly as a punt returner, where he collected 19 returns for 162 yards.

When Clemons first joined the Toronto Argonauts in 1989, guest running backs coach Tom Cudney nicknamed him "Pinball" because of his running style. His diminutive size and extraordinary balance allowed him to bounce between defensive players much like a pinball inside a pinball machine. During home games, The Who song "Pinball Wizard" would play on the P.A. each time Clemons was involved in a great play. In his first game with the Argonauts, Clemons was named the player of the game. In 1990, Clemons received the CFL's Most Outstanding Player Award after setting a single season record for all-purpose yards (3,300). The following year, Clemons won his very first football championship as his Argonauts defeated the Calgary Stampeders to win the Grey Cup. Clemons went on to win two more Grey Cups as a player when Doug Flutie led the Argonauts won back-to-back titles during the 1996 & 1997 seasons. In 1997, Clemons surpassed his own single season all-purpose yards record from 1990 by recording 3,840 all-purpose yards. This mark stood until 2012, when it was broken by Chad Owens. On September 15, 2000, Clemons played his last ever game as an Argonaut. During his 12-year playing career with the Argonauts he set many team records including career pass receptions (682), punt return yards (6,025), punt returns (610), punt return touchdowns (8), kickoff return yards (6,349), and kickoff returns (300). He also set single season single-season punt return yards (1,070 in 1997), punt returns (111 in 1997), and kickoff returns (49 in 1997). Clemons also amassed a career 25,438 combined yards during the regular season, a CFL record.

In 2008, Clemons was inducted into the Canadian Football Hall of Fame. And in 2009, Clemons was also inducted into the Ontario Sports Hall of Fame.

Coaching career 
Upon ending his playing career, Clemons became interim head coach of the Toronto Argonauts in 2000, replacing John Huard, who resigned after compiling a 1–6–1 record. When offered the head coaching job by team general manager J. I. Albrecht, Clemons was reluctant to accept it, wanting to spend more time with his family. According to Clemons, "it was an awkward situation. After saying no, they said do us the favour of going home and discussing it with your family. The burden was that this team, this organization, had given our family so much that Canada was going to be our home. The Argos had everything to do with my family becoming a part of this country. Because of all I had been given I decided it was my time to reciprocate." As interim head coach, Clemons coached the Argos to 6 wins out of their remaining 8 games. He had the interim tag removed from his title at the end of the season. In November 2001, he was promoted to President of the Argonauts and relinquished his role as head coach in the process to Gary Etcheverry.

When Etcheverry was fired as head coach on September 17, 2002, Clemons returned as head coach on an interim basis with 6 games remaining in the 2002 CFL season. Clemons was officially given the head coaching job again on December 17, 2002, while also relinquishing his role as team president. He remained the head coach until 2007. Clemons was nominated for the Annis Stukus Trophy every year from 2002 to 2007, coming up short each time.

In the 2004 CFL season, Clemons was the first black head coach to ever appear in a Grey Cup game. He became the first black head coach to win a Grey Cup championship during that same Grey Cup game, while also being the second black coach to ever guide his team to a pro football championship in North America. (Darren Arbet of the San Jose SaberCats was the first to do so in 2002 with an ArenaBowl XVI victory.) Clemons downplayed this milestone achievement, saying, "To tell you the truth, I don't know what it means to be the first Black coach in the (Grey) Cup and to win it. I know that I can't do anything by myself, and on my own strength I'm very little good. Anything I accomplish has to be with the aid of individuals, and this team became like a family and is a family, it had very little to do with the colour of my skin".

Clemons has the second most head coaching wins in Argonauts history with 67. (Bob O'Billovich is first with 89.) Clemons' record is 67–54–1 in the regular season over parts of seven seasons, with a 6–5 playoff record (including 1–0 in his lone Grey Cup appearance). As a coach, his nickname was often shortened to "Pinner" by his players.  After retiring as head coach, he became the team's chief executive officer in 2008.

Sports administrator 
From November 2001 to September 2002, Clemons served as the Toronto Argonauts President. He ended his tenure as President to resume his second stint as the team's head coach. In 2003, Clemons shared both responsibilities as the team's head coach & general manager. Though he was the de facto GM of the Argonauts as a result of an administrative shake up of the team, much of the player roster management duties were deferred to Greg Mohns, the team's director of football operations & player personnel. Clemons would relinquish his GM title to Adam Rita at the end of the season. On December 4, 2007, Clemons stepped down as head coach of the Argonauts to become their new Chief Executive Officer. At the end of the 2008 Toronto Argonauts season, Clemons announced that he would no longer act in the day-to-day business of the organization and on May 6, 2009, Bob Nicholson was announced as the new president and chief executive officer of the Argonauts. On that same day, Clemons was appointed the Vice-Chair of the team. In his new role, Clemons advises the president & C.E.O. on key sales and corporate partner programs, significant community initiatives, and brand and media relations. On October 8, 2019, Clemons was named as the new general manager of the team, replacing Jim Popp who was relieved of his GM duties with 4 games remaining in the 2019 Toronto Argonauts season. Clemons would also work closely with John Murphy, the team's vice president of player personnel, in assembling the roster.

Personal life

Clemons is also a motivational speaker, making frequent public appearances throughout the community. He is also a partner of the children's brand Simply Kids, a line of diapers, baby food and healthcare products found in supermarkets across Canada and the United States.

Currently, Clemons resides in Oakville, Ontario with his wife, Diane (a native Floridian), and three daughters (who were all born in Canada); Rachel, Raven and Rylie. Clemons has described himself (borrowing a quote from C.D. Howe) as an "American by birth but Canadian by choice". In 2000, Clemons became a permanent resident of Canada. It had once been suggested that Clemons had remained an American citizen to rebuff any calls for him to run for political office, such as for mayor of Toronto. Clemons was the subject of Pinball: The Making of a Canadian Hero a biography written by Perry Lefko published in 2006.

In April 2007, he visited Calderstone Middle School in Brampton to help start a reading program.

On August 21, 2007, Clemons founded the "Michael 'Pinball' Clemons Foundation" which is dedicated to helping disadvantaged youth.

On March 23, 2009, Clemons appeared on the CTV News @ 6 as a celebrity guest host to do the weather in celebration of Dave Devall's retirement. He is currently working with Marc Kielburger and Craig Kielburger, founders of Free the Children, in an initiative to build schools and clean water systems in Africa.

On November 14, 2012, Clemons visited and gave a speech about life topics in Markham, Ontario for York Regional District School Board's annual QUEST Forum to promote Student Achievement and Well-Being.

On February 28, 2014, Clemons visited the Scouts Canada National Leadership summit to speak about teamwork and working as one team to kick off the new program and strategic plan announcement.

On April 28, 2015, Clemons officially became a naturalized citizen of Canada.

Clemons was recognized on February 10, 2017 by the College of William and Mary, his alma mater, with an honorary degree during Charter Day ceremonies, where he also was principal speaker.

From February 10–26, 2017, Clemons partnered with Global Pet Foods and Air Miles for the "Show Us Your Heart" event. Its goal is to raise money for homeless pets, rescue groups, and animal shelters across Canada through donations made at Global Pet Food stores.

Achievements 
 CFL record for most all-purpose yards, All-Time Regular Season: 25,396 (1989–2000)
 Recorded over 5,000 career yards in rushing (5,232), pass receptions (7,015), kickoff returns (6,349), and punt returns (6,025)
 Argonauts team records for career pass receptions (682), punt return yards (6,025), punt returns (610), punt return touchdowns (8), kickoff return yards (6,349), and kickoff returns (300)
 Argonauts team records for single-season punt return yards (1,070 in 1997), punt returns (111 in 1997), and kickoff returns (49 in 1997)
 Argonauts team record for single-game kickoff returns (8) on August 21, 1990, versus Edmonton Eskimos
 CFL most outstanding player (1990)
 Three-time Grey Cup champion as a player (1991, 1996, 1997)
 One-time Grey Cup champion as a head coach (2004)
 Two-time Grey Cup champion as a Vice chairman (2012, 2017)
 First black head coach to reach & win a Grey Cup championship (2004)
 Two-time CFL All-Star (1990, 1997)
 Two-time Tom Pate Award winner (1993, 1996)
1995 John Candy Memorial Award
 One-time Eastern Division Most Outstanding Player Trophy winner (1990)
 Four-time Eastern Division All-Star (1990, 1993, 1994, 1997)
 Voted one of the CFL's Top 50 players (#31) of the league's modern era by Canadian sports network TSN.
 Was inducted into the Canadian Football Hall of Fame in 2008.
 Was inducted into the Ontario Sports Hall of Fame in 2009.
 Retired number by the Toronto Argonauts (#31)

Honours
 He was appointed as a Member of the Order of Ontario in 2001, giving Him the Post Nominal Letters "O.Ont" for Life. In 2011, he was one of the recipients of the Top 25 Canadian Immigrant Awards presented by Canadian Immigrant Magazine.

Honorary Degrees
Michael "Pinball" Clemons has received honorary degrees from several universities. These include:

Legacy
In 2012 in honour of the 100th Grey Cup, Canada Post used his image on a series of commemorative postage stamps. The image was also used on presentation posters and other materials to promote the Grey Cup game and other celebrations associated with the centennial.

CFL coaching record

CFL GM record

Coaching tree
Assistants under Clemons that became NFL, CFL, or NCAA head coaches:

 Aaron Best: Eastern Washington (2017–present)

References

Further reading 

 Q & A with Pinball Clemons for Now Magazine (July 12–18, 2007)
 Interview with The Good Point (Oct. 7, 2008)
 Liberal senator likes Clemons' 'politics of hope' (Toronto Star Column, Oct. 26, 2008)

External links

 Michael "Pinball" Clemons Foundation website
 Toronto Argonauts profile
 
 CFL.ca stats
 CFLapedia bio
 DatabaseFootball.com stats

1965 births
Living people
African-American Christians
African-American coaches of Canadian football
African-American players of American football
African-American players of Canadian football
African-American sports executives and administrators
American emigrants to Canada 
American expatriates in Canada
American football return specialists
American football running backs
American motivational speakers
American philanthropists
American Protestants
American sports executives and administrators
Black Canadian players of Canadian football
Canadian Christians
Canadian Football Hall of Fame inductees
Canadian Football League Most Outstanding Player Award winners
Canadian football people from Toronto
Canadian football return specialists
Canadian football running backs
Canadian motivational speakers
Canadian people of African-American descent
Canadian philanthropists
Canadian Protestants
Canadian sports executives and administrators
Dunedin High School alumni
Kansas City Chiefs players
Members of the Order of Ontario
Naturalized citizens of Canada
People from Dunedin, Florida
Players of American football from Florida
Players of Canadian football from Florida
Players of Canadian football from Ontario
Sportspeople from Oakville, Ontario
Sportspeople from Pinellas County, Florida
Tampa Bay Buccaneers players
Toronto Argonauts coaches
Toronto Argonauts general managers
Toronto Argonauts players
Toronto Argonauts team presidents
William & Mary Tribe football players
William & Mary Tribe men's soccer players
Association footballers not categorized by position
Association football players not categorized by nationality